Liubov Sheremeta (born 17 January 1980) is a Ukrainian former artistic gymnast. She competed at the 1996 Summer Olympics.

Competitive history

See also
List of Olympic female gymnasts for Ukraine

References

1980 births
Living people
Gymnasts at the 1996 Summer Olympics
Olympic gymnasts of Ukraine
Sportspeople from Lviv
Ukrainian female artistic gymnasts
21st-century Ukrainian women